James Edward Lockyer  (born May 27, 1949) is a  Canadian lawyer, law professor, and former politician.

Life and career
James E. Lockyer graduated with a BA degree from Mount Allison University in Sackville, New Brunswick and earned his LLB at the University of New Brunswick. He went on to London, England to study at the London School of Economics and Political Science, obtaining his LLM degree in 1976. Fluent in the French language, he obtained a DEA from the Université de Paris 1 (Panthéon-Sorbonne) in 1979.

After being admitted to the Barrister's Society of New Brunswick in September 1975, Lockyer practiced law with the Moncton law firm of Stewart & Cooper. In November 1977, he became the first full-time person hired by the Université de Moncton for its new Faculté de droit which was established to teach common law in French. Lockyer taught at the Faculté de droit until June 1987. During this time he was appointed vice-dean and acting dean in 1983 and then Dean of the Faculté de droit from 1984 to 1987. After his career in provincial elected office (1987-1999), he returned to the Faculté de droit in 2000 where he taught full-time until 2019. Since then, he has remained active at the Faculté de droit teaching courses in trial and appellate advocacy. In 2020, he began teaching trial advocacy as a visiting professor at the Faculty of Law at the University of New Brunswick. His area of expertise is Civil Procedure, the Law of Sales and both appellate and trial advocacy.

From 2007 until 2017 Lockyer taught trial advocacy to lawyers at Osgoode Hall Law School's annual Intensive Trial Advocacy Workshop and since 2007 continues to teach members of the Quebec Bar in its program "Techniques de plaidoirie" at the Université de Sherbrooke. From 2007 until 2019 he was a visiting teacher of trial advocacy to students at the University of Notre Dame Law School in South Bend Indiana. From 2008 to 2016 he conducted biannual Intensive Trial Advocacy Programs for Atlantic Canadian lawyers at the Université de Moncton where he has also presented written advocacy programs for lawyers. He has conducted trial advocacy programs for the Alberta Public Prosecutors Association, the Quebec Department of Justice and law firms. He is a past president of the Sopinka Cup National Trial Advocacy Competition involving Canadian law schools and was a member of the organizing committee from 2001 until 2022. From 2007 until 2023, he authored the annual case file problem for the Sopinka Cup Competition. from 2001 to the present, he has organized and conducted the annual McKelvey Cup Trial Advocacy Competition for Atlantic region law schools. In June 2008, Lockyer was named a recipient of the American College of Trial Lawyers "Award of Merit" for his contribution to the teaching of trial advocacy.

For 16 years (1983-1999) Lockyer held public office. He was elected to Moncton City Council in 1983 and re-elected in 1986. In the 1987 New Brunswick general election, Lockyer was elected to the Legislative Assembly of New Brunswick as the Liberal Party's candidate for the riding of Moncton West. He was re-elected in 1991 and 1995 New Brunswick general elections. Following his party taking power, on October 27, 1987 Lockyer was appointed Attorney General and Minister of Justice, posts he would hold twice. In addition, he served as the Minister of Supply and Services and Minister of Education. For three months in 1998 he was the acting Minister of Economic Development and Tourism. His last Cabinet post was Solicitor General in 1998-1999. In the 1999 New Brunswick general election James Lockyer lost by 1,253 votes to the Progressive Conservative Party's candidate. During his time as a member of the Legislative Assembly, Lockyer was Chairman of The Select Committee on Maritime Economic Union which reported its recommendations to the Legislative Assembly in 1992 as well as a member of the Law Amendments Committee and other standing committees.

Lockyer is a former president of the Law Society of New Brunswick. He was appointed Queen's Counsel in 1987. Between 2003 and 2005, he was a member on the Federal Government's Transportation Appeal Tribunal of Canada (TATC). He is a former member of the New Brunswick Securities Commission. He served twenty-three years in the Canadian Armed Forces Reserve and was awarded the Canadian Forces Decoration and Clasp. He is currently the Honorary Colonel of the 8th Canadian Hussars (Princess Louise's).

Active in community affairs, Lockyer is a former vice-president of the Murial MacQueen Fregusson Foundation and was actively involved in its fight against domestic and family violence. He served for many years as vice-president of the Dr. George L. Dumont Hospital's Tree of Hope Cancer fundraising campaign. He is a former Board Chair of the Greater Moncton YMCA. He was Chair of the organizing committee of the 2009 World Curling Championships. He was named recipient of the Lieutenant-Governor's Dialogue Award by Dialogue NB in June 2009. Lockyer co-chaired the YWCA "Transitionelle" Campaign raising funds for the establishment of the "Jean Irving Centre for Women and Children" in Moncton. He is a past Chair of the 3Plus Economic Development Corporation for the Greater Moncton area (Dieppe-Moncton-Riverview). He is currently a member of the Board of Directors of the Greater Moncton Romeo LeBlanc International Airport. He remains involved with various community organizations. On November 27, 2018 he was invested into the Order of New Brunswick. In 2022, he was awarded Moncton Rotary Club's 101 Resilience award. In 2023, he was awarded the Distinguished Service Award by the New Brunswick Branch of the Canadian Bar Association.
          
An instrument-rated private pilot with single and multi-engine ratings, he is the President of the local branch of the Canadian Owners and Pilots Association's (COPA), and a former Vice Chair and member of the Board of Directors of the Moncton Flight College. He is a former member of the Board of Directors of Hope Air, a national charity that arranges free non-emergency medical flights for low-income Canadians who must travel far from home to access healthcare. He remains a volunteer pilot with Hope Air. Mr. Lockyer is a former member of the Board of Directors of the Nova Scotia International Air Show Association. He is a former vice-president of the Halifax Harbour Airport Association and he is Vice-president of the Moncton Aero Club Inc.

Mr. Lockyer resides in Moncton NB with his wife, the Honorable Brigitte Robichaud. They have two adult children.

Election results

1999 election

|Progressive Conservative
|Joan MacAlpine||align=right|3898||align=right|53.91||align=right|+36.27||align=right|$19,681
|-

|Liberal
|Jim Lockyer||align=right|2645||align=right|36.58||align=right|-25.25||align=right|$17,326
|-

|NDP
|Teresa Sullivan||align=right|687||align=right|9.50||align=right|+1.26||align=right|$2,650
|-
|colspan=3 align=right|Total valid votes/expense limit||align=right|7230||align=right|100.00||align=right colspan=2|$24,708
|-
|colspan=3 align=right|Total rejected ballots||align=right|22||align=right|0.20||colspan=2|
|-
|colspan=3 align=right|Turnout||align=right|7252||align=right|67.53||align=right|+4.81|||
|-
|colspan=3 align=right|Electors on list||align=right|10,739||colspan=3|
|-
|bgcolor="#9999FF"|   
|style="width: 180px" colspan=2|Progressive Conservative gain from Liberal
|align=right|Swing||align=right|+30.76||colspan=2|
|}

1995 election

1991 election

1987 election

|Liberal
|James E. Lockyer|Jim Lockyer||align=right|4853||align=right|64.24||align=right|+26.85||align=right|$14,787
|-

|Progressive Conservative
|Mabel DeWare||align=right|1916||align=right|25.36||align=right|-29.48||align=right|$13,295
|-

|NDP
|David Lang||align=right|786||align=right|10.40||align=right|+2.63||align=right|$1,808
|-
|colspan=3 align=right|Total valid votes/expense limit||align=right|7555||align=right|100.00||align=right colspan=2|$16,476
|-
|colspan=3 align=right|Total rejected ballots||align=right|47||align=right|0.47||colspan=2|
|-
|colspan=3 align=right|Turnout||align=right|7602||align=right|76.76||align=right|-2.13|||
|-
|colspan=3 align=right|Electors on List||align=right|9904||colspan=3|
|-
|bgcolor="lightcoral"|   
|style="width: 180px" colspan=2|Liberal gain from Progressive Conservative
|align=right|Swing||align=right|+28.17||colspan=2|
|}

References
 University of New Brunswick law alumni
 James Edward Lockyer profile at the Transportation Appeal Tribunal of Canada
 

1949 births
Mount Allison University alumni
University of New Brunswick alumni
Alumni of the London School of Economics
University of Paris alumni
Canadian legal scholars
Lawyers in New Brunswick
New Brunswick Liberal Association MLAs
Members of the Executive Council of New Brunswick
People from Moncton
Living people
People from Halifax, Nova Scotia
Canadian King's Counsel
University of New Brunswick Faculty of Law alumni